Gerti Schanderl (born 12 October 1956) is a German former figure skater who represented West Germany. She is the 1973 Prize of Moscow News champion, the 1973 Nebelhorn Trophy bronze medalist, and a four-time German national champion.

Schanderl was born in Munich, the daughter of a production line seamstress and a federal railway locksmith. She achieved her highest ISU Championship placement, fourth at the 1974 Europeans in Zagreb and the 1974 Worlds in Munich. A member of EC München, she was coached by Rosemarie Brüning before joining Manfred Schnelldorfer in March 1976.

Competitive highlights

References 

1956 births
German female single skaters
Living people
Sportspeople from Munich